is a Japanese light novel series written by Ryo Mizuno. Six volumes were published by MediaWorks (now ASCII Media Works) between 2001 and 2005. An anime television series adaptation animated by J.C.Staff aired on TV Tokyo from January to March 2005. Starship Operators is licensed in North America by Geneon.

Plot
Starship Operators is about the 73rd class of the Defense University of the Planet Kibi.

The original command crew all abandon ship, as per the conquerors' demands. Left alone on the ship, the cadets decide to keep their command and fight on. To this end, they have decided to ask Galaxy Network to fund the operation of Amaterasu as a fleeing self-governed nation in exchange for letting them broadcast the ship's adventures live - as a reality TV program.

The novel's storyline also features Amaterasu finding its way through space to reach the control zone of another super power, the Henrietta Independent Federation, for protection.

Characters
The Amaterasu command structure is divided into three bridges. If the first bridge is inoperable or unavailable, any of the other two may assume command. The Operators' uniform color signifies their station.

Primary (Command) Bridge
Operator uniform color: blue

Sinon is the main protagonist and executive officer of the Amaterasu. She is a brilliant strategist in combat, often providing CO Kanzaki with a voice of reason. She is also one of the most resistant in fighting with the Amaterasu against the kingdom. Sinon has some problems when is comes to understanding feelings and thus may appear cold.

Alley is quiet and reserved, and often handles the ship-to-ship communications. She is fighting to avenge the destruction of the Maizuru that her father commanded. This hatred results in her being one of the most driven members of the crew to the point of near recklessness at times. 

Miyuri is one of Sinon's close friends, and the chief astronomer. She joined the Defense Forces because the starships, in particular the Amaterasu, carry the best observatories in the galaxy. Miyuri has some of the best eyes on the ship and spends most of her free time observing the stars.

The commanding officer of the Amaterasu. He is an excellent administrator but easily cracks under the pressures of battle. The only thing that prevents him from totally folding under the pressure at times is his pride as a man and officer. Captain Kanzaki is slightly pessimistic but he and the others use that nature to find flaws in combat plans and ways of improving the plans for maximum efficiency. Cisca is considered to be one of the leaders by the Kingdom. He was one of the two people on the ship that is aware that someone else is pulling the strings behind the scenes.

Secondary (Fire Control) Bridge
Operator uniform color: orange

The shy and relaxed teenage daughter of the president of a Kibi corporation called "Wakana Rare Metals". She has a two year crush on Takai Kiryu but has not acted on it all.

Although she is one of the youngest members on board, she acts as the crew's "big sister".

A short cadet who is cheerful and lackadaisical.

The fire control chief, and commander of the second bridge. Nicknamed the "King of Fighters" among the cadets, he is also an accomplished marksman. A very laid back young man with a strong will that doesn't give into peer pressure and doesn't believe that others should either, thus he gets frustrated with the other crew members who feel forced into staying on the ship. Takai also lost a father on the Guard Ship Maizuru but rather than fighting for vengeance like Alley Hisaka, he is more concerned about the justice of the Kingdom’s actions and uses the battles as a form of protest. Takai is considered third in command of the ship even though he directly states that he is unsuited for full leadership.

Tertiary (Navigation) Bridge
Operator uniform color: red

An easygoing cadet who has a good sense of humor.

Text-message pals with Sinon, but an otherwise quiet young woman. Renna is an agent of Kibi Intelligence that was to keep and eye on the ship. She dies from gunshots from soldiers while on the planet of Shu. Renna desperately wanted to be a full member of the crew but was unable due to her job as spy.

She is from a family of diplomats and politicians, and brought her uncle, former Kibi Prime Minister Tatsuma Mamiya, on board as head of the government-in-exile. She is a very politically intelligent woman who at times acts as the public face of the crew. Rio is one of the two people who knows that someone else is pulling the strings behind the scenes. While she puts on a strong face, Rio is afraid of dying in the fighting. She only ever allows this vulnerability to be shown around Cisca Kanzaki. She was head of the debate team while in the academy.

The navigation control chief, and commander of the third bridge. In addition to being the helmsman of the Amaterasu, Shinto also pilots the Amaterasus small shuttle, and is among the best flight controllers in the Defense Forces. He was given officer status due to his high grades and the fact he is one of the few males on the ship. That was done for the Network. Shinto's piloting skills have allowed him to save a number of his fellow crew's lives.

Other Amaterasu Crew Members
Operator uniform color: purple

Shimei Yuuki

A child prodigy, he holds mathematics and theoretical physics degrees at the age of 15. He is also the systems administrator of the AESOP computer, and is the only commissioned officer who remained on board the Amaterasu. Shimei spends most of his time away from the rest of the crew because of the need to work in a sealed room with AESOP. He always seems to smile even when in the face of imminent doom. Shimei dies in the final episode piloting the Amaterasu as a fireship, asserting his official rank as superior to the cadets'.

Minase Shinohara

The ship's only medical staff, who was a trainee during the shakedown cruise. She is highly pressed for her medical skills.

Sei Ogino

The ship's supply chief, and an expert economist.

Kouki Sakakibara

The chief engineer of the Amaterasu. He is nicknamed Oyassan (Old Man) by fellow crew mates, to his annoyance. Kouki does his best to keep the engineering crew from panicking but due to the high demand for his level of skill, the chief engineer can not always break up every dispute. Kouki tries to act like a father to the young crew, especially Sinon.

Henrietta Planetary Alliance
Admiral Dul Elroy

The commanding officer of the Alliance heavy cruiser Conquistador. He is the first to start treating the Amaterasu as a real threat while his constitutions cannot see beyond the fact that the Amaterasus is made up of mostly children. The Admiral believes that only a three to one advantage over the Amaterasu will have a chance of beating the warship and its cunning crew. Elroy was responsible for sinking the Shenlong. While he is an officer of the Alliance, this man is willing to directly challenge orders if they go in the face of destroying the Amaterasu.

Hans Georg Hermann

An intelligence officer in the Alliance military.

Civilians
Dita Mirkov

The enthusiastic reporter for the Galaxy Network reality show Starship Channel. She starts to sympathize with the crew and at times forgets that she isn’t officially part of the crew itself.

Peter Spikes

The cynical, sarcastic producer for Starship Channel that heads the show and provided funds for the ship. He cares more about the ratings than the lives of the crew and only cares about the show.

President Rau

Episodes

Ships
 Amaterasu - 3rd Freedom Guard Ship, Kibi Planetary Nation
 (name origin: Amaterasu (天照), a sun goddess and a principal Shinto deity)
 CO: Cisca Kanzaki
 XO: Shinon Kouzuki
 Crew: 46
 Length: 310 m
 Width: 105 m
 Primary Armament: 4600 mm Plasma Cannon
(possibly derived from the 460 mm naval guns mounted on the Yamato-class battleships)
 Secondary Armament: Torpedoes/Missiles
 Tertiary Armament: one "Revolver" - 5 chamber LASER cannon, one Pulse LASER, one Plasma Coil Gun
 Defensive Munitions: Anti-Laser Defensive Systems
			Kasumi (霞, "misty") - Magnetic wave reflection plate
			Ikasumi (烏賊墨, "squid ink")- Magnetic wave absorption fiber
 Armor: Hotaru (蛍, "Firefly") Heat Protection Plates
 Sensor: Kamioka (神岡) - Neutrino emission Sensor
 	(origin: Kamioka Observatory)
 Onboard Artificial Intelligence (AI): AESOP (Artificial Encephalon System by Optical Processor)
     (name origin: Aesop, an ancient Greek story teller)
 Propulsion: 2 main thrusters
 	      6 sub thrusters
 Max acceleration 5G+ (with auxiliary boosters)
 Destroyed: EP 13

 Trafalgar - 21st Battleship (Destroyer Class), Henrietta Alliance (15:50 Ep 2)
 (name origin: Battle of Trafalgar, British naval victory over combined French and Spanish fleets, 1805)
 CO: Captain Joseph Meyer
 Primary Armament: Laser cannons
 Defensive Armament: 10000 mm Plasma cannon
 Destroyed: EP 2

 Maizuru - 2nd Freedom Guard Ship, Kibi Planetary Nation (07:52 Ep 3)
 (name origin: Maizuru (舞鶴市 Maizuru-shi), a city in Kyōto Prefecture 京都府, headquarters of the JMSDF Western District fleet)
 CO: Captain Hisaka Jin
 Destroyed: EP 1

 Aboukir - Stealth Ship, Henrietta Alliance (7:30 Ep 4)
 (name origin: Battle of Aboukir Bay, Japanese name for Battle of the Nile, British naval victory over French fleet, 1798)
 CO: Admiral Ricardo Fares
 Destroyed: EP 4

 Actium - Stealth Ship, Henrietta Alliance
 (name origin: Battle of Actium, Naval victory of Gaius Octavius' over Marcus Antonius and Cleopatra VII, 31 BC)
 Primary Armament: Laser Cannon
 Defenses: Invisible to active and passive sensors
 Destroyed: EP 12

 Solomon - Flagship, Henrietta Alliance
 (name origin: Battles of the Solomon Sea, Japanese name for a series of naval engagements during the Guadalcanal Campaign, 1942.
 CO: Fleet Admiral August Perry
 Appeared in novel

 Shenlong - Battleship, Shu Planetary Nation, (12:35 EP 7)
(name origin: Shenlong, (神竜, Shinryū, lit. "Spirit Dragon"), a spiritual dragon from Chinese mythology)
 CO: Captain Wong
 Primary Armament: 1 Plasma Cannon
 Secondary Armaments: 4 missile launchers
 Tertiary Armaments: 4 pulse lasers, 2 pulse beams
 Propulsion: 1 main thruster
	      2 sub thrusters
 Max Acceleration: 7 G
 Destroyed: EP 8

 Conquistador - Battleship, Henrietta Alliance, Gordova Planetary Nation (13:03 EP 7)
(name origin: Conquistador, a term used for Spanish and Portuguese explorer-soldiers during Spanish conquest of Americas)
 CO: Admiral Dulle Elroy
 Primary Armament: 1x 4000 calibre Plasma Cannon
 Secondary Armament: 1x 300PM class LASER Cannon
 Propulsion: 2 Main thrusters
	      8 sub-thrusters
 Max Acceleration: 10 G
 Destroyed: EP 13

 Lissa (Dragonfly) - Warship (Skipper Class), Henrietta Alliance (13:10 EP 7)
 (name origin: Battle of Lissa (1866), Austrian naval victory over Italy; Battle of Lissa (1811), British naval victory over combined French and Venetian squadron)
 CO: Captain Harrel Naja
 Primary Armament: Lisa2 - Assault Module (pulse laser), capable of precision short-warp
 Propulsion: 1 Main thruster
	      4 sub-thrusters
 Max acceleration: 8 G
 Destroyed: EP 11

 Leyte (Hammerhead) - Armored Battleship (Corvette Class), Henrietta Alliance (13:28 EP 7)
(name origin: Battle of Leyte, Japanese name for the Battle of Leyte Gulf, October 1944)
 CO: Captain Yun-suk Lee
 Primary Armament: 4 Separating turrets (1 plasma cannon, 3 laser cannons)
 Propulsion: 1 Main thruster
	      4 sub-thrusters
 Max Acceleration: 7 G
 Destroyed: EP 8

 Mariana (Hedgehog) - High Speed Warship (Frigate Class), Henrietta Alliance (13:35 EP 7)
(name origin: Battle of the Marianas, Japanese name for the Battle of the Philippine Sea near the Mariana Islands, June 1944)
 CO: Admiral Louis Belmont
 Primary Armaments: 4 LASER Cannons
 Propulsion: 2 main thrusters
	      6 sub-thrusters
 Max Acceleration: 9.5 G
 Destroyed: EP 11

 Levant, Recon Ship, Henrietta Alliance (19:27 EP 9)
(name origin: Battle of the Levant, Japanese name for Battle of Navarino, 1827)
 CO: Captain Tiet Langa
 Incapacitated: EP 11

 Earth Federation Warship (EP 12)
 CO: Captain Josef Truman 
(possibly a reference to former American President Harry S. Truman)
 Primary Armament: 4 LASER Cannons

 Unknown Henrietta Alliance warship (EP 1)
Primary Armaments: 1 Railgun
Support facilities: Onboard refinery capable for producing ammunition from nearby Asteroids
Destroyed: EP 1

Additional info - First names of ship captains from 

Fictional spacecraft by work

Organizations

(Name origin: Henrietta, a feminine given name ultimately derived from the Germanic name Henrik, which means "Ruler of the home" or "Lord of the house.")
Militaristic alliance of nations within Henrietta region of known space. It has forced several neighbouring planetary nations into submission, and after securing nonaggression treaties, purchases their weaponry at ridiculous bargains. Because of such practices, this alliance is nicknamed the "Kingdom".
Planetary Nation of Kibi
(Name origin: Kingdom of Kibi (吉備国, Kibi no kuni), a kingdom based in Western Japan during the 4th century) 
Home of crew of Amaterasu. Currently has a pacifist administration. Surrenders to Henrietta Alliance after destruction of 2nd Guard Ship, Maizuru.
Planetary Nation of Shu
(Name origin: Kingdom of Shu (蜀國), an ancient state based in what is now Sichuan, China.) 
Government which used to be closer to Henrietta Alliance before the Amaterasu incidents. The Amaterasu and its crew have many fans in Planet Shu.
Galaxy Network
Large media corporation that finances the purchase of the Amaterasu and its crew's fight against the Henrietta Alliance, by creating a reality show based on it. Starship Channel broadcasting is based in Hollywood.
Arima General Industrial (AGI) Corp.
(Name origin: Arima clan (有馬氏, Arima-shi), a Japanese kin group.)
Large conglomerate that is equivalent to today's Boeing, and the company that developed and built the Amaterasu. AGI also acts as an intermediary for sale of military hardware.

Alliance of planetary nations that competes for power with the Kingdom.
Appeared in novel.
Earth Federation (Originally: Earth Alliance Planetary Nation)
A political power centered on Earth, rivalling or surpassing in power all others.

Places
Kibi
(name origin: Kingdom of Kibi, 4th century western Japanese kingdom that acted as cultural bridge between Korea and Yamato, conquered by Yamato)
Home planet of Amaterasu and its crew.

Phoenicia
(name origin: ancient Phoenicia, located north of the Canaan, enterprising maritime culture, conquered by Persia)
Neutral system where Amaterasu sought temporary sanctuary. It is located near Kibi.

Shu
(name origin: Shu (state), one of major states during China's warring states era, conquered by Qin)
Planet of origin for Captain Wong and Shenlong

Gordova
(name origin: Cordoba, Spain, Spanish city conquered by Moors)
Planet of origin for the Conquistador and its original crew.

Palmia
(name origin: Palmyra, Ancient Syrian city, conquered by Romans)
Location of Arima General Industry (AGI) Headquarter

Theme songs
Opening theme
Radiance
by Mami Kawada
arranged by Tomoyuki Nakazawa

Ending theme
Chi ni Kaeru ~on the Earth~
by Kotoko
arranged by Yoichi Shimada

Staff
 Director - Takashi Watanabe
 Screenplay - Yoshiko Tomizawa
 Music - Kenji Kawai
 Original Work - Ryo Mizuno
 Character Design - Fumio Matsumoto
 Mech Design - Kimitoshi Matsumoto
 Sound Director - Toru Nakano

Japanese Companies
 Geneon Entertainment, Inc.: - Production
 J.C.Staff - Animation Production
 MediaWorks - Production
 TV Tokyo - Broadcaster/Production

External links
 TV Tokyo's Starship Operators website (Japanese)
 
 Starship Operators at the Internet Movie Database (IMDB)

2001 Japanese novels
Anime and manga based on light novels
Dengeki Bunko
Dengeki Comics
Kadokawa Dwango franchises
Drama anime and manga
Geneon USA
J.C.Staff
Light novels
Military science fiction
NBCUniversal Entertainment Japan
Shōnen manga
Space opera anime and manga